The Cactus Kid is a 1935 American Western film directed by Harry S. Webb and starring Jack Perrin, Jayne Regan and Philo McCullough.

Main cast
 Jack Perrin as Cactus Kid  
 Fred Humes as Jimmie 
 Philo McCullough as Duncan  
 Slim Whitaker as Plug 
 Joe De La Cruz as Cheyenne 
 Jayne Regan as Beth  
 Tom London as Sheriff  
 Kit Guard as Smiley  
 Tina Menard as Rosie  
 Hal Taliaferro as Andy

References

Bibliography
 Pitts, Michael R. Poverty Row Studios, 1929–1940: An Illustrated History of 55 Independent Film Companies, with a Filmography for Each. McFarland & Company, 2005.

External links
 

1935 films
1935 Western (genre) films
1930s English-language films
American Western (genre) films
Films directed by Harry S. Webb
Reliable Pictures films
American black-and-white films
1930s American films